The 1990 SANFL Grand Final was an Australian rules football game contested between the Port Adelaide Football Club and the Glenelg Football Club, held at Football Park on Sunday 7 October 1990. It was the 89th annual Grand Final of the South Australian National Football League, staged to determine the premiers of the 1990 SANFL season. The match, attended by 50,589 spectators, was won by Port Adelaide by a margin of 15 points, marking that club's thirtieth premiership victory. 

It was the last time that Australian rules football was played in South Australia without the presence of an AFL club.

Background

Port Adelaide's AFL bid
The 1990 SANFL Grand Final was the last time until Port Adelaide's elevation to the AFL in 1997 that the two best South Australian football teams in the state would go head to head. This was due to the Port Adelaide Football Club's application to enter the AFL earlier in the year which eventually failed due to legal challenges. These turn of events met with resistance and outrage from the SANFL and other SANFL teams. The SANFL had officially resisted entering an Adelaide-based team in the AFL for the next three years, but Port Adelaide's attempted entry had forced their hand. Subsequently, the SANFL promptly formed the Adelaide Crows in a board meeting that lasted two hours.

Scott Hodges SANFL goal-kicking record
Port Adelaide full forward Scott Hodges who won the 1990 Magarey Medal, went into the match 4 goals off the all-time record of 151, set by Sturt's Rick Davies in 1983.

Port Adelaide-Glenelg rivalry
In 1934 Glenelg won its first flag against Port Adelaide. In the years leading up to the match the two teams had contested the premiership on three occasions, in 1977, 1981 and 1988, with Port Adelaide successful each time.

Entertainment

Kate Ceberano provided the prematch entertainment for the game. She sang "Young Boys Are My Weakness" from her album Brave during the players' warm-ups and also sang the Australian National Anthem before the bounce.

Brave became a major success in the Australian charts, firmly establishing Ceberano as one of Australia's premier artists, and would become the most commercially successful album of her solo career.

Match summary

Port Adelaide won the coin toss and chose to kick to the Southern End of Football Park in the first quarter.

1st quarter 
The game started as a tight arm wrestle with the ball moving from end to end and both sides failing to convert multiple opportunities and set shots. Eleven minutes into the game the scores read  0.2 (2) to  0.5 (5). Eventually  full forward Scott Hodges took a mark in the Magpies goal square and kicked the opening goal of the game. At the following centre bounce Glenelg captain Chris McDermott gave away a free kick that resulted in a quick mark and goal by Wayne Mahney from outside 50.  won the third centre bounce and Rod Jameson kicked a bouncer along the ground from 30 metres out to register the Tigers first goal of the day. Both sides were unable to obtain control of the ball until Paul Hallahan broke away from a centre contest and kicked a low dart to first year player Matthew Liptak who converted for 's second goal. Before the next centre bounce a fight broke out at the southern end with the majority of the players on the field involved. The umpires subsequently awarded a free kick to David Marshall and the ball proceed to travel up and down the ground before going out of bounds along the western wing. Darren Smith marked the ball 40 metres from 's goals but due to another fight breaking out he was awarded a 50-metre penalty and kicked a sitter from the top of the goal square. The ball travelled from end to end until a free was awarded against George Fiacchi for a high tackle on John Fidge who converted from 25 metres out. Long kicking was a feature for the remainder of the quarter. Adrian Settre kicked along the ground for Ports next goal. To end the quarter John Fidge started to overpower Ben Harris kicking two goals in succession to help Glenelg enter the break with a three-point lead.

2nd quarter 
The second quarter began in the same way as the first with defensive pressure restricting opportunities to score. Again it would be Scott Hodges who would kick the first goal of the quarter after a push in the back from 35 metres out. Hodges would kick another goal shortly after from directly in-front.

Late in the second quarter Adrian Settre kicks two goals in two minutes to break the game open. Stephen Williams kicks a goal from 60m out to give Port Adelaide a four-goal lead at half time. Matthew Liptak has a shot for Glenelg after the siren but only manages a behind.

3rd quarter 
After leaving the field injured during the second quarter Scott Hodges took to the field in his customary full forward position. Scott Salisbury kicked the first goal of the quarter on the run from 45 metres.

4th quarter 
At the 6-minute mark of the final quarter Scott Hodges takes a mark at centre half forward and kicks his 5th goal for the match and his 153rd goal for the season to set the SANFL's goal-kicking record.

Teams
Port Adelaide were captained by Russell Johnston and coached by John Cahill.  Glenelg was captained by Chris McDermott and coached by Graham Cornes.

Scorecard

Postmatch 
The game was John Cahill's 7th premiership and the last SANFL Premiership awarded before the advent of the Adelaide Crows.

The bitterness against Port Adelaide for their AFL entry bid was summed up by Glenelg coach Graham Cornes in his post-match speech to the Port players when after congratulating them on their efforts criticised the club for ending the good days of football in the state. Cornes was then hastily ushered out amongst jeers and singing from Port players and officials. Ironically, Cornes left Glenelg to coach the Crows in 1991.

The entry of an Adelaide-based team significantly weakened the SANFL competition by taking the best players from each club.  From Port Adelaide, the Crows took Hodges, Darren Smith, Tregenza, Abernethy, and David Brown, while Wanganeen joined Essendon, Hynes joined West Coast, and Rohan Smith joined St Kilda. From Glenelg, the Crows took Murphy, Marshall, Jameson, McDermott, Liptak, Thompson, Bartlett and coach Cornes.

While SANFL clubs had been losing star players to AFL teams for several years, the entry of the Adelaide Crows, seen then as virtually a state team, made it more acceptable and even expected for the top SANFL players to join other AFL clubs also.

When Port Adelaide finally entered a team in the AFL in 1997, John Cahill was the inaugural coach with Mark Williams as Assistant Coach and Gavin Wanganeen was captain. David Brown and Scott Hodges were also members of the initial playing squad.

See also 
 Showdown (AFL)
 1934 SANFL Grand Final 
 1977 SANFL Grand Final 
 1981 SANFL Grand Final 
 1988 SANFL Grand Final 
 1992 SANFL Grand Final

References 

SANFL Grand Finals
Sanfl Grand Final, 1990